Rockwest, also known as Possum Bend, is an unincorporated community in Wilcox County, Alabama.

References

Unincorporated communities in Alabama
Unincorporated communities in Wilcox County, Alabama